Maroubra Speedway, officially known as Olympia Motor Speedway was a motor racing venue in the Sydney suburb of Maroubra, New South Wales, Australia and was reported to have had a capacity of 70,000.

Opening
It officially opened with its first meeting on Saturday, 5 December 1925,

Among the competitors on that first evening were two women: Marie Jenkins, of Melbourne, in a Brecia Bugatti, and Mrs. J.A.S. Jones, of Lithgow, in a Crossley Sports.

At the speedway's third meeting, on Saturday, 2 January 1926, Jenkins was the first woman to win a final race -- i.e., rather than just a heat -- at the speedway.

The Olympia Motor Speedway
The 1 mile banked concrete bowl was the scene of some large and successful race meetings before a decline in attendances saw the track close in 1927, but reopened many times in the 1930s.

Despite the banking being too steep to walk up, it was still not enough for the speeds achieved, and four competitors lost their lives going over the top of banking. Three others also died at the circuit, two of whom were motorcyclists.

The sensationalist media of the day dubbed it a "killer track" which did little to improve the fortunes of the venue.

The speedway continued to operate sporadically in the 1930s but the meetings were not the large affairs held previously.

The track was used for club days, practice, and record attempts;<ref>{{cite web| url= http://members.iinet.net.au/~gacocks/story3.html | title = The Story of Silver Wings", p.3. | archiveurl= https://web.archive.org/web/20121010151005/http://members.iinet.net.au/~gacocks/story3.html | archivedate= 2012-10-10 }}</ref> and was also used for testing.

Demolition
By the 1940s the track was crumbling due to flooding and poor quality concrete. In 1947, it was demolished, and a (1,100 dwelling) housing commission suburb was built on the site, with a park, named Coral Sea Park, developed in what had once been the infield area.

Streets in the new area — e.g., Astoria Circuit (USS Astoria), Chicago Avenue (USS Chicago), Lexington Place (USS Lexington), Morris Place (USS Morris), Neosho Way (USS Neosho), Perkins Street (USS Perkins), Sims Lane and Sims Grove (USS Sims) — were named after Allied ships that had been engaged in the Battle of the Coral Sea.

Footnotes

References
 70,000 Spectators were Thrilled at Opening of Sydney's New Speedway, The Sporting Globe, (Wednesday, 9 December 1925), p.11
 Racing Motors: Opening of Maroubra Speedway, The (Sydney) Sun, (Sunday, 6 December 1925), p.8.
 Motoring and Engineering: Maroubra Speedway.—Great Opening Meeting, The Cumberland Argus and Fruitgrowers Advocate, (Fri, 11 December 1925), p.11.
 Goldsmith, Heather, A Maroubra Speedway Scrap Book: A Miscellany of Stories, Photographs and Details of Sydney's Spectacular, but Tragically Short-Lived Motor Racing Circuit 1926-1936'', Bol d'Or Publishing, (Leura), 2017.

External links
 Vintage Speedway
 Speedway and Road Race History: Sydney (NSW): 1925 Olympia Motor Speedway.

Defunct speedway venues in Australia
Sports venues in Sydney
Sports venues completed in 1925
Sports venues demolished in 1947
Demolished buildings and structures in New South Wales
Maroubra, New South Wales
Demolished sports venues